Daniel Antonsson is a musician and songwriter from Gothenburg, Sweden, formerly playing guitar in Dimension Zero. He is also the former bassist for Dark Tranquillity, playing on the album We Are the Void, and former guitarist for Soilwork, recording with them on their album Sworn to a Great Divide. He uses Esp Nv-std guitar and Mayones Guitars & Basses.

His music career started in a band called "Pathos".

On 18 March 2014, a heavy metal band considered a supergroup with mostly Swedish members named Akani, was announced and formed by Antonsson himself on Co-Guitar, Jorge Rosado (Merauder, ex-Ill Niño) on Vocals, Anders Björler (At the Gates, ex-The Haunted) on Co-Guitar, Victor Brandt (Dominion, ex-Aeon, ex-Entombed, ex-Satyricon) on Bass guitar & Anders Lowgren (Dead Reprise) on Drums. On the same day, the band released a song titled "Who's to Blame?" from their upcoming four-song seven-inch single called "Santa Muerte", where the album art was released as well. Santa Muerte was released in March 2014 through Demons Run Amok Records and the release was produced, recorded and mixed by the band themselves and with Martin Jacobsson at Rovljud Studios in Örebro.

Discography
with Dimension Zero
 This Is Hell (2003)
 He Who Shall Not Bleed (2007)
with Soilwork
 Sworn to a Great Divide (2007)
with Dark Tranquillity
Projector (1999/2009)
Where Death Is Most Alive (2009)	  
The Dying Fragments (2009)	  
 We are the Void (2010)
Zero Distance EP (2012)

References

Living people
1974 births
21st-century bass guitarists
21st-century Swedish male musicians
The Resistance (Swedish band) members
Dark Tranquillity members
Dimension Zero (Swedish band) members
Soilwork members